Qılınclı (also, Qılışlı, Klychly, and Kylychly) is a village in the Lachin Rayon of Azerbaijan.

References 

Populated places in Lachin District